Two ships of the Royal Navy have borne the name HMS Marne, after the river Marne in France, site of the First Battle of the Marne in 1914:

  was an  launched in 1915 and sold in 1921.
  was an M-class destroyer launched in 1940.  She was sold to the Turkish Navy in 1958 and renamed Mareşal Fevzi Çakmak.  She was discarded in 1970.

Royal Navy ship names